Mombaruzzo is a comune (municipality) in the Province of Asti in the Italian region Piedmont, located about  southeast of Turin and about  southeast of Asti.

Mombaruzzo borders the following municipalities: Bruno, Carentino, Cassine, Castelnuovo Belbo, Fontanile, Frascaro, Gamalero, Maranzana, Nizza Monferrato, Quaranti, and Ricaldone.

Mombaruzzo is known for the "Amaretti of Mombaruzzo".

References

External links
 Official website

Cities and towns in Piedmont